Stygophalangium karamani is a species of arachnid. Although sometimes classified as a harvestman in the infraorder Eupnoi (Phalangioidea), its identity is uncertain, but it is probably a species of Acari (mites).

Name
The genus name is a combination of Styx, the river of Greek mythology and the harvestman genus Phalangium. The species is named after zoologist Stanko Karaman, who collected the described specimen.

References
 Joel Hallan's Biology Catalog: Stygophalangiidae

Harvestmen
Animals described in 1933
Arachnids of Europe
Cave arachnids
Taxa named by Anthonie Cornelis Oudemans